EMI Recorded Music Australia Pty Ltd (called EMI Music Australia until May 2013) is an Australian imprint of Universal Music Australia, formerly a subsidiary label of EMI Recordings Ltd and, between 1979 and 1996, that of Thorn EMI. It is Australia's largest major dance music label as well it was one of Australia's largest major labels overall until the Universal acquisition. Corporate headquarters are located in Sydney, Australia.

History 

EMI Recorded Music Australia Pty Ltd has its origins as the local branch of The Gramophone Company in 1925. Together with other labels taken over by RCA Corporation it became EMI in 1931 with the local branch in Australia known as The Gramophone Co. (Australia). According to Australian music commentator, Duncan Kimball, "the vast majority of jazz and dance records released here between the two world wars were by British artists and orchestras." In 1949 the branch was incorporated as EMI (Australia) Pty Ltd and was headquartered in Sydney as a wholly owned subsidiary of United Kingdom's EMI. Due to its house labels, it dominated the Australian market from the mid-1920s to the early 1960s.

By October 1951 EMI Australia's catalogue held over 10,000 titles, which comprised 80% of recorded music in the country. In January 1952 EMI announced they were recording major works by Sydney Symphony Orchestra.

Current artists

Some artists are from EMI Records (UK) and Capitol Music Group (U.S.), but distributed in Australia by EMI.
360
5 Seconds Of Summer
Aaron Carpenter
Dope Lemon
Angus & Julia Stone
Alison Wonderland
Arctic Monkeys
Bastille
Beck
Bob Evans
Birds of Tokyo
Calum Scott
Carrie Underwood
Choomba
City Girls
Crowded House
Daniel Johns
Diana Rouvas
DREAMS
Elton John
Emeli Sandé
Empire of the Sun
Eric Church
Evan Klar
FLETCHER
Freya Ridings
Halsey
Hey Violet
Hootie & The Blowfish
Hot Chip
Human Buoy
Jake Bugg
Illenium
Jess Kent
John Lennon
Jonas Blue
Kasey Chambers
Katy Perry
Kate Miller-Heidke
Keith Urban
Kian
Kirin J. Callinan
Liam Payne
Lil Yachty
Loyle Carner
Luke Bryan
Maggie Rogers
Mark Knopfler
Meg Mac
Metallica
Middle Kids
Miiesha
Missy Higgins
MNEK
NF
Neil Finn
Niall Horan
Nicole Millar
Ninjawerks
Norah Jones
Odette
Oh Mercy
Olympia
Paul Dempsey
Paul Kelly
Paul McCartney
Pez
The Presets
Pond
Quavo
Queen
 Rest for the Wicked
Robert Forster
Rosanne Cash
Ricki-Lee
Ryan Adams
Sam Bluer
Sam Smith
Sarah Blasko
Sky Ferreira
Slowthai
Something for Kate
Szymon
Takeoff
Tex, Don and Charlie
The Avalanches
The Beatles
The Chemical Brothers
The Last Shadow Puppets
The Money War
The Vamps
Tina Arena
Troye Sivan
Tori Kelly
Tuka
VAST
Vic Mensa
Wiinston
Young Bombs

Former artists
AC/DC
Alesso
The Aston Shuffle
Banks
Beth Ditto
Birtles & Goble
Brian Wilson
Glades
Jamie McDell
Jamie T
Jamiroquai
Jean Stafford
Johnny Farnham
KLP
Ladyhawke
The Last Shadow Puppets
Leah Mencel
Little River Band
Mary J. Blige
MINX
The Saints
Slim Dusty
The 12th Man

Albums
EMI Music Australia releases its own compilations and singles, most of which are mixed by prolific DJs from Australia and occasionally overseas although rarely release compilations mixed in-house.

See also

List of Universal Music Group labels
List of Universal Music Group artists
List of EMI artists
List of EMI labels
List of record labels

References

External links

Australian companies established in 1948
Universal Music Group
EMI
Australian subsidiaries of foreign companies
Music companies of Australia